Tamil may refer to:
 Tamils, an ethnic group native to India and some other parts of Asia
Sri Lankan Tamils, Tamil people native to Sri Lanka also called ilankai tamils
Tamil Malaysians, Tamil people native to Malaysia
 Tamil language, natively spoken by the Tamils
 Tamil script, primarily used to write the Tamil language
Tamil (Unicode block), a block of Tamil characters in Unicode
 Tamil dialects, referencing geographical variations in speech
 Tomil, also spelled Tamil, a municipality on Yap, Federated States of Micronesia

See also
 Tamil cinema, also known as Kollywood, the word being a portmanteau of Kodambakkam and Hollywood.
 Tamil cuisine
 Tamil culture, is considered to be one of the world's oldest civilizations.
 Tamil diaspora
 Tamil Eelam, a proposed independent state in the north and east of Sri Lanka
 Tamil Nadu, one of the 28 states of India
 Tamil nationalism
 Tamil News, a daily Tamil-language television news program in Tamil Nadu
 Tamilakam, the geographical region inhabited by the ancient Tamil people, covered today's Tamil Nadu, Kerala, Puducherry, Lakshadweep, and southern parts of Andhra Pradesh and Karnataka.
 
 
 Thamizh, a 2002 Indian Tamil film starring Prashanth

Language and nationality disambiguation pages